Ören is a village in the Boyabat district of Sinop Province, Turkey. It is often known by the name Kumarlı.

References
http://www.earthsearch.net/featureIndex.php?type=int&start=2581000&end=2582000
http://plasma.nationalgeographic.com/mapmachine/

Villages in Boyabat District